Konnovo is a rural locality (a village) in Bereznikovskoye Rural Settlement, Sobinsky District, Vladimir Oblast, Russia. The population was 17 as of 2010.

Geography 
Konnovo is located 24 km south of Sobinka (the district's administrative centre) by road. Nerozhino is the nearest rural locality.

References 

Rural localities in Sobinsky District